During the 1997–98 English football season, Watford F.C. competed in the Football League Second Division.

Season summary
In the 1997–98 season, Kenny Jackett was demoted to the position of assistant manager and Graham Taylor returned for a second spell as Watford manager. The transition proved a success; Watford secured the Division Two title, beating Bristol City into second place after a season-long struggle.

Final league table

Results
Watford's score comes first

Legend

Football League Second Division

FA Cup

League Cup

Football League Trophy

Players

First-team squad
Squad at end of season

Reserve squad

References

Notes

Watford F.C. seasons
Watford